Mehdi Mouidi (born 24 October 1940) is a Moroccan alpine skier. He competed in the men's slalom at the 1968 Winter Olympics.

References

1940 births
Living people
Moroccan male alpine skiers
Olympic alpine skiers of Morocco
Alpine skiers at the 1968 Winter Olympics